The cycling competitions at the 2018 Mediterranean Games took place on 27 and 30 June at the Vila-seca Urban Circuit.

Athletes competed in four events.

Medal summary

Medalists

Medal table

References

External links
2018 Mediterranean Games – Cycling

 
Sports at the 2018 Mediterranean Games
2018
Mediterranean Games